Bosom Friends is a 1934 American short film produced by E. W. Hammons. It was nominated for an Academy Award at the 7th Academy Awards in 1934 for Best Short Subject (Novelty). The film was preserved by the Academy Film Archive, in conjunction with the UCLA Film and Television Archive, in 2013.

Cast
 James F. Clemenger as Narrator

References

External links

1934 films
1934 short films
American short films
Canadian short films
American black-and-white films
Canadian black-and-white films
Educational Pictures short films
American independent films
Canadian independent films
1930s English-language films
1930s American films
1930s Canadian films